William John Alexander (June 12, 1924 – June 17, 1997), better known as Bill Alexander, was a Canadian football halfback who played for the Calgary Stampeders of the Canadian Football League. He played nine games for the Stampeders from 1946 to 1947. He died at Rockyview General Hospital in Calgary in June 1997, five days after turning 73.

References 

1924 births
1997 deaths
Calgary Stampeders players
Canadian football running backs